Edvin Jurisevic (born June 7, 1975) is an American soccer referee from Omaha, Nebraska. He has been a FIFA referee since 2010.

References

Living people
American soccer referees
Major League Soccer referees
CONCACAF Champions League referees
1975 births
Place of birth missing (living people)
Sportspeople from Omaha, Nebraska
Croatian emigrants to the United States
North American Soccer League referees